Anaba is a town in the Ali Sabieh Region of Djibouti. It is located 34 km south-west of the capital, Djibouti City.

Overview
It lies on the National Highway 5. Nearby towns and villages include Dasbiyo (24 km), Holhol (5 km) and Goubetto (22 km).

Demographics
The town inhabitants belong to various mainly Afro-Asiatic-speaking ethnic groups, with the Issa Somali predominant.

Populated places in Djibouti